Hayathnagar is a busy residential locality Hyderabad in Ranga Reddy district of the Indian state of Telangana, pincode 500070 & 501505 . It is Mandal headquarter of Hayathnagar mandal of Hayathnagar revenue division. Hayathnagar forms circle No 3 in Greater Hyderabad Municipal Corporation.  There are four wards i.e  Nagole (11) Mansoorabad (12), Hayathnagar (13) and B. N. Reddy Nagar (14) in this circle. It lies on National Highway 65.

History 
The area was named after Hayath Bakshi Begum, the daughter of Mohammed Quli Qutub Shah, the fifth Sultan of the Qutb Shahi dynasty. The Hayat Bakshi Mosque is also located here. So this Area is called as Hayathnagar

There is a Sai Baba Temple located which is also famous for this Area

See also
Hayat Bakshi Mosque

References 

Neighbourhoods in Hyderabad, India
Greater Hyderabad Municipal Corporation
Municipal wards of Hyderabad, India